Aleksandrs Samoilovs (born April 6, 1985) is a beach volleyball player from Latvia.

Samoilovs and teammate Mārtiņš Pļaviņš, with whom he partnered since 2004, represented Latvia at the 2008 Summer Olympics in Beijing, China. The duo defeated the number 2 seed, Phil Dalhausser and Todd Rogers, in their first-round game, in what announcers called "the biggest upset in Olympic beach volleyball history." The Latvian team won its preliminary round group and in round of 16 lost to Austrian team Florian Gosch and Alexander Horst.

After the Olympics Samoilovs and Pļaviņš stopped playing together.

At the 2012 Summer Olympics, he teamed with Ruslans Sorokins, where he again finished in 9th, reaching the round of 16, where they lost to Jonas Reckermann and Julius Brink of Germany.

He now partnering with Jānis Šmēdiņš.

Best achievements 
1st place World Tour 2013 and 2014
 1st place U-21 World championship
 1st place U-23 European championship
 1st place U-20 European championship
 two times Latvian champion
 5th place World tour in Italy in 2007
 5th place World tour in Spain in 2008
 9th place Olympic Games 2008
 9th place Olympic Games 2012
 1st place European championship 2015

References

External links
 
 
 
 

1985 births
Living people
Latvian beach volleyball players
Men's beach volleyball players
Beach volleyball players at the 2008 Summer Olympics
Beach volleyball players at the 2012 Summer Olympics
Beach volleyball players at the 2016 Summer Olympics
Olympic beach volleyball players of Latvia
Sportspeople from Riga
FIVB World Tour award winners